Douglas Clark Francis Kenney (December 10, 1946 – August 27, 1980) was an American comedy writer of magazine, novels, radio, TV and film who co-founded the magazine National Lampoon in 1970. Kenney edited the magazine and wrote much of its early material. He went on to write, produce and perform in the influential comedies Animal House and Caddyshack before his sudden death at the age of 33.

Early life
Douglas Clark Francis Kenney was born in West Palm Beach, Florida to Estelle "Stephanie" (Karch) and Daniel Harold "Harry" Kenney, both originally from Massachusetts. His paternal grandparents, Daniel J. Kenney and Eleanor Agnes (Noonan), were of Irish origin. His maternal grandparents, Anthony Karczewski and Victoria Lesniak, were Polish. He was named for General Douglas MacArthur. His family moved to Mentor, Ohio, in the early 1950s, before settling in Chagrin Falls, Ohio, a suburb of Cleveland. Kenney lived in Chagrin Falls from 1958 to 1964 and attended Gilmour Academy, a Catholic prep high school for boys in nearby Gates Mills, Ohio. He was married to Alexandra Appleton Garcia-Mata.

Career

National Lampoon

While at Harvard University, Kenney was a member of the Signet Society, president of the Spee Club and editor of The Harvard Lampoon. Kenney frequently collaborated with  Henry Beard and the two wrote the short novel Bored of the Rings, which was published in 1969. Kenney graduated in 1968. Soon after, he, Beard and fellow Harvard alumnus Robert Hoffman began work on founding the humor magazine National Lampoon.

Kenney was one of the originating forces of what became known during the 1970s as the "new wave" of comedy: a dark, irreverent style of humor that Kenney used as the basis for the magazine. Kenney was editor-in-chief from 1970 to 1972, senior editor from 1973 to 1974 and editor from 1975 to 1976. Thomas Carney, writing in New Times, traced the history and style of the National Lampoon and the impact it had on comedy's new wave. "The National Lampoon," Carney wrote, "was the first full-blown appearance of non-Jewish humor in years -- not anti-Semitic, just non-Jewish. Its roots were W.A.S.P. and Irish Catholic, with a weird strain of Canadian detachment. . . . This was not Jewish street-smart humor as a defense mechanism; this was slash-and-burn stuff that alternated in pitch but moved very much on the offensive. It was always disrespect everything, mostly yourself, a sort of reverse deism."

Kenney wrote much of the Lampoon's early material, such as "Mrs. Agnew's Diary," a regular column written as the diary of Spiro Agnew (or "Spiggy")'s wife, chronicling her life amongst Richard Nixon and other famous politicians. The feature was an Americanized version of Private Eyes long-running column "Mrs. Wilson's Diary," written from the viewpoint of Prime Minister Harold Wilson's wife.

To escape the pressures of running a successful magazine, Kenney sometimes took unannounced extended breaks, although, despite these absences, "Mrs. Agnew's Diary" was always submitted to the Lampoon. During one of these breaks he wrote a comic novel, Teenage Commies from Outer Space. Kenney threw the manuscript out his office window after a negative review from Beard. Beard later said the book simply made no sense and was all over the place. National Lampoon's 1964 High School Yearbook, which Kenney co-wrote with P. J. O'Rourke was the best selling edition of the magazine, it was based on an earlier two-page piece by Michael O'Donoghue, a "National Lampoon" writer and editor.

Kenney had a five-year buyout contract with the Lampoons publisher, 21st Century Communications. Kenney, Beard and Hoffman took advantage of this, dividing a sum of $7 million amongst them. Kenney remained on staff until 1977, when he left the magazine to co-write the screenplay to National Lampoon's Animal House, with Chris Miller and Harold Ramis.

Kenney had a small role in Animal House as Delta fraternity brother "Stork," with only two lines of dialogue. Stork's key scene is in the big parade climax, when he pushes the drum major away and leads the marching band down a blind alley. We see him and Miller, as Hardbar, in the same shot during the escapade. Kenney hand-selected this role for himself as it was the role that fit him best. Produced on a very modest budget, National Lampoon's Animal House was, until Ghostbusters in 1984, the most profitable comedy film in Hollywood history.

Caddyshack
Kenney produced and wrote Caddyshack with Brian Doyle-Murray and Harold Ramis. Kenney also had a small role in Caddyshack as a dinner guest of Al Czervik.

When Caddyshack opened to negative reviews in July 1980, Kenney became deeply depressed, although Ramis joked that the film was "a six-million-dollar scholarship to film school."

Death
Chevy Chase and Kenney went to Kauai, Hawaii. After Chase left for work, Kenney's girlfriend, Kathryn Walker, came to keep him company, but she also had to return to work. Chase was preparing to return to Hawaii when he received a telephone call telling him that his friend was missing.

Kenney died on August 27, 1980, aged 33, after falling from a 35-foot cliff called the Hanapepe Lookout. Police found his car the following day. His death was classified as accidental by Kauai police.

Found in Kenney's hotel room were notes for projects he had been planning, jokes, and an outline for a new movie. A gag line that he had left was also found: "These last few days are among the happiest I've ever ignored." The National Lampoon published a tribute to him by Matty Simmons, and a cartoon showing a sign next to the edge of a cliff with the inscription, "Doug Kenney Slipped Here."

Legacy
Kenney received a nomination from The Writers Guild of America for his National Lampoon's Animal House screenplay (along with Harold Ramis and Chris Miller).

The June 1985 issue of National Lampoon, titled "The Doug Kenney Collection," was dedicated entirely to Kenney and contained a compilation of all of his contributions.

Chris Miller paid homage by naming the main character in his 1996 film Multiplicity "Doug Kinney." 

Twenty-six years after Kenney's death, the book A Futile and Stupid Gesture: How Doug Kenney and National Lampoon Changed Comedy Forever was published, a biography on Kenney and the impact he made on comedy and the people he knew. The book was adapted into the 2018 Netflix feature film A Futile and Stupid Gesture, which stars comedian Will Forte as Kenney and is narrated by the actor Martin Mull, who plays a fictional 70-year-old version of Kenney who had survived into old age.

Bibliography
Bored of the Rings (1969) (with Henry Beard)
Harvard Lampoon Time (1969) (with Henry Beard)
National Lampoon (1970–1977) (founder, with Henry Beard and Robert Hoffman) 
National Lampoon's 1964 High School Yearbook Parody (1974) (with P. J. O'Rourke)

FilmographyExecutive producer'''
 Modern Problems (1981)

References

Further reading
 New Times, August 21, 1978
 People, September 1, 1980
 Esquire, October, 1981
 Karp, Josh. A Futile and Stupid Gesture: How Doug Kenney and National Lampoon Changed Comedy Forever''  (2006)

External links
 
 
 
 
 Cult classic, an homage to Doug Kenney, ESPN/Golf Digest, April 2004

1946 births
1980 deaths
Accidental deaths from falls
American humorists
American satirists
American parodists
Parody novelists
American magazine editors
American male screenwriters
American people of Irish descent
American people of Polish descent
The Harvard Lampoon alumni
People from West Palm Beach, Florida
National Lampoon people
20th-century American novelists
Accidental deaths in Hawaii
American male novelists
People from Palm Beach County, Florida
20th-century American male writers
People from Chagrin Falls, Ohio
20th-century American non-fiction writers
American male non-fiction writers
Screenwriters from Ohio
Screenwriters from Florida
20th-century American screenwriters